Conformicide is the fourth studio album by American thrash metal band Havok, released on March 10, 2017. It is Havok's first album for Century Media Records after having released their three previous albums and 2012 EP Point of No Return on Candlelight Records, their only release with bassist Nick Schendzielos and their first studio album since Unnatural Selection (2013), making it the longest gap between the band's albums.

Track listing

Personnel 
Havok
 David Sanchez – lead vocals, rhythm guitar, lead guitar
 Reece Scruggs – lead guitar, backing vocals
 Pete Webber – drums
 Nick Schendzielos – bass, backing vocals

Guests
 John Hernandez – additional shouting
 Tim Ryan – Introductory news announcement in "Intention to Deceive"

Charts

References 

2017 albums
Havok (band) albums
Century Media Records albums
Albums produced by Steve Evetts